Johns is a surname shared by the following prominent people:

 Adrian Johns (born 1951), Royal Navy vice-admiral, former Second Sea Lord and former Governor of Gibraltar
 Alan Johns (1917–1997), New Zealand scientist, chief executive and university administrator
 Alfred Johns (1868–1934), Australian cricketer, son of Peter Johns
 Andrew Johns (born 1974), Australian former rugby league footballer, brother of Matthew Johns
 Andrew Johns (triathlete) (born 1973), British triathlete
 Andy Johns (1950–2013), British music engineer
 Ben Johns (born 1999), an American professional pickleball player
 Bobby Johns (born 1932), American former racecar driver
 Brian Johns (born 1982), Canadian Olympic swimmer
 Brian Johns (businessman) (1936–2016), Australian company director and journalist
 Catherine Johns (born 1941), museum curator and Roman archaeologist
 Charles A. Johns (1857–1932), American lawyer, jurist and politician; justice on the Supreme Court of the Philippines
 Charles Alexander Johns (1811–1874), British botanist and author
 Charley Eugene Johns (1905–1990), American politician, 32nd governor of Florida
 Chris Johns (disambiguation), several people
 Claude Hermann Walter Johns (1857–1920), English Assyriologist and Church of England clergyman
 Daniel Johns (born 1979), Australian musician
 David Johns (born 1948), American Navaho painter
 Don Johns (born 1937), Canadian retired National Hockey League player
 Doug Johns (born 1967), American retired Major League Baseball pitcher
 Emmett Johns, Canadian humanitarian
 Ethan Johns (born 1969), British music producer
 Fred Johns (1868–1932), Australian writer
 Gary Johns (born 1952), Australian politician
 Gene Johns (1927–1984), American businessman and politician
 Geoff Johns (born 1973), American comic book author
 George Sibley Johns (1857–1941), American journalist and newspaper editor
 Glyn Johns (born 1942), British record producer
 Glynis Johns (born 1923), British actress
 Harold E. Johns (1915–1998), Canadian medical physicist
 Helen Johns (born 1953), Canadian former politician
 Helen Johns (swimmer) (1914–2014), American swimmer, Olympic champion and former world record-holder
 James Edward Johns (1900–1984), American football player
 Jasper Johns (born 1930), American painter and printmaker
 John Johns (1796–1876), fourth Episcopal bishop of Virginia, son of Kensey Johns
 Johnny Johns (born 1951), American retired figure skater and ice dancer
 Joseph Johns (1826–1900), English convict and Australian bushranger, better known as Moondyne Joe
 Joseph Johns, Amish man who founded Johnstown, Pennsylvania in 1800
 Keith Johns (1902–1979), Australian rules footballer
 Kensey Johns (judge) (1759–1848), American judge
 Kensey Johns Jr. (1791–1857), American politician and lawyer, son of the above
 Laura M. Johns (1849–1935), American suffragist, journalist
 Les Johns (born 1942), Australian rugby league footballer
 Margo Johns (1919–2009), British actress
 Matthew Johns (born 1971), Australian Rugby League footballer of the 1990s and 2000s and channel 9 host, brother of Andrew Johns 
 Mervyn Johns (1899–1992), Welsh actor, father of Glynis Johns
 Michael Johns (policy analyst) (born 1964), American political commentator, analyst and writer; former White House speechwriter
 Milton Johns (born 1938), British television actor
 Orrick Glenday Johns (1887–1946), American poet, son of George Sibley Johns
 Paddy Johns (born 1968), Irish former rugby union player
 Paul Johns (born 1958), American retired National Football League player
 Peter Johns (1830–1899), Welsh-born Australian engineer, founder of Johns & Waygood, father of Alfred Johns
 Richard Johns (born 1939), British Royal Air Force air chief marshal
 Robert J. Johns, Canadian socialist labour organizer in the 1910s
 Ronnie Johns (politician) (born 1949), American politician from Louisiana
 Sammy Johns (1946–2013), American country musician
 Sarah Johns (born 1979), American country music singer
 Stephen Johns (disambiguation)
 Stratford Johns (1925–2002), British stage, film and television actor
 Thomas Johns (minister) (1836–1914), Welsh minister
 Tony Johns (born 1960), Canadian football player
 Tracy Camilla Johns (born 1963), American film actress
 Vere Johns (1893–1966), Jamaican journalist, impresario, radio personality and actor
 Vernon Johns (1892–1965), American minister and civil rights leader
 W. E. Johns (1893–1968), British writer
 Wilbur Johns (1903–1967), American collegiate basketball head coach and athletics director

See also
 Jones (disambiguation)

English-language surnames
Patronymic surnames
Surnames from given names